Elizabeth of Brandenburg (1425 – after 13 January 1465) was a princess of Brandenburg by birth and marriage Duchess of Pomerania.

Life 
Elizabeth was a daughter of the Margrave John the Alchemist of Brandenburg-Kulmbach (1406–1464) from his marriage to Barbara (1405–1465), daughter of Duke Rudolf III of Saxe-Wittenberg.  Elizabeth's father renounced his rights to the succession in Brandenburg and instead received the Franconian possessions of the House of Hohenzollern.  Her sisters were Queen Dorothea of Denmark and Marchioness Barbara of Mantua.

She married on 27 August 1440 with Duke Joachim I of Pomerania-Stettin (1427–1451). The marriage was meant to seal a treaty between Brandenburg and Pomerania. Joachim died of the plague in Szczecin, after eleven years of marriage.  He had one son: Otto III of Pomerania-Stettin.

On 5 March 1454, she married her second husband, Duke Wartislaw X of Pomerania-Rügen (1435–1478).  In 1464, her father and all three of her sons died.  After the death of Otto III, a war erupted between Pomerania and Brandenburg about the inheritance of the Stettin branch of the family.

Her second marriage was a very unhappy one.  She felt that her husband had ...planned to kill her, and take her life and limb and, although it would be unchristian and pitiable, revoke her interests and pensions.  Because of great distress and poverty, her uncle gave her Lippehne and Berlinchen instead of her father's Arnswalde.

For Frederick, the fate of his niece was the motivation to break off negotiations with Wartislaw about Stettin and push through his claims on Pomerania.  After mediation by Duke Henry of Mecklenburg-Stargard, Wartislaw accepted Pomerania as a fief of the Electorate of Brandenburg.

Issue 
Elisabeth had a son from her first marriage to Joachim:
 Otto III (1444–1464), Duke of Pomerania-Stettin.

From her second marriage with Wartislaw, she had two sons:
 Swantibor (1454–1464)
 Ertmar (1455–1464)

Ancestry

References 
 Friedrich Wilhelm Barthold: Geschichte von Rügen und Pommern, Band 4, F. Perthes, 1843, p. 289 ff.

External links 
 http://www.ruegenwalde.com/greifen/war-10/war-10.htm

External links 

German duchesses
House of Hohenzollern
House of Griffins
1425 births
1465 deaths
15th-century German people
15th-century German women
Daughters of monarchs